The Mahindra XUV300 is a subcompact crossover SUV produced by the Indian automaker Mahindra & Mahindra. It is based on the X100 platform of SsangYong Tivoli and has been sold in Indian market since February 2019. Mahindra slotted it in the segment along with their Bolero Neo (formerly called the TUV300) to rival the Maruti Suzuki Vitara Brezza, Tata Nexon and the Ford EcoSport.

History 
The XUV300 was initially codenamed as S201. Based on European spec Ssangyong Tivoli, it underwent major modifications to suit Indian roads and market conditions. The SUV was wind tunnel tested at Pininfarina facility in Italy.  Mahindra officially revealed the name of XUV300 in December 2018. The SUV is wider and taller than Tivoli in dimensions but is made shorter than the counterpart to fit into sub-four-meter segment. It also resembles its sibling XUV500 in looks with similar projector headlamps and DRLs, front grille and the wheel arches. It was launched on 14 February 2019 in India.

Engine 
The XUV300 is powered by a 1.2-litre 3-cylinder petrol engine and a 1.5-litre 4-cylinder diesel engine with 6-speed manual transmission. A 6-speed automatic variant is also now available.

Safety 
The Mahindra XUV300 was tested in its most basic safety specification of 2 airbags and standard ISOFIX anchorages. It scored 5 stars for adult occupant protection and 4 stars for child occupant protection, scoring the highest combined rating for any Indian car tested yet and the first four-star child safety rating. Its structure was deemed to be capable of higher loading. It is also the first five-star rated car to offer side and curtain airbags as an option. It offers side, curtain and knee airbags only as an option on all variants. ESC is optional. ISOFIX anchorages are standard. The car offers head restraints for all passengers in its higher variants, however the three-point seatbelt which was available for the middle rear occupant on higher variants at launch has now been replaced by a less safe 2-point lap belt across the range.

Mahindra sponsored a UN ESC test and pedestrian protection test with Global NCAP in 2020 (similar to Latin NCAP 2013), which it passed, hence earning the car Global NCAP's coveted Safer Choice Award.

Mahindra XUV 400 
On September 11, 2022, Mahindra announced electric version of the XUV 300, named XUV 400. It retains the same design and equipment of its petrol--driven counterpart. It is equipped with 39.4 kWh Li-ion battery pack with estimated 456 km range as tested by ARAI. Its motor is located in the front axle producing 150 hp and 310 Nm of torque with 0 to 60 mph in 8.1 s. Critics praised the vehicle for its performance and ease of use, but many noted its lack of premium features and the overall interior being dated. Its main competitor is Tata Nexon EV.

References

External links 
 Mahindra XUV300

 Mahindra XUV300 BS6

Mahindra vehicles
Compact sport utility vehicles
Cars introduced in 2019
Crossover sport utility vehicles
Cars of India
Mini sport utility vehicles
Global NCAP small family cars